Joonas Kuusela is a Finnish professional ice hockey goaltender who currently plays for Guildford Flames of the EPIHL. He has previously also played for the Pelicans of the SM-liiga in his native country Finland.

References

External links

Living people
Lahti Pelicans players
Sportspeople from Espoo
1990 births
Finnish ice hockey goaltenders